The Music City Walk of Fame in downtown Nashville, Tennessee, is a walk of fame that honors significant contributors to Nashville's musical heritage and significant achievements in the music industry.

Each honoree is commemorated with a large stainless steel and terrazzo star embedded in the sidewalk in Walk of Fame Park between the Country Music Hall of Fame, Bridgestone Arena, and Schermerhorn Symphony Center.

The walk was established in 2006 by the Nashville Convention and Visitors Bureau. Gibson Guitars is a founding sponsor.

Since 2014, the park has been under construction and is set to be reopened on June 4, 2015.  A new plaque design will be revealed along with the induction of artists Jack White and Loretta Lynn.

Inductees
Honorees are inducted twice annually, in the spring and fall.

November 2006 inductees:
 Reba McEntire
 Ronnie Milsap 
 Kenneth Schermerhorn (inducted posthumously)
 The Fisk Jubilee Singers 
 Boudleaux and Felice Bryant (posthumous for both)
 Roy Orbison (inducted posthumously)

April 2007 inductees:
 The Crickets
 Emmylou Harris
 John Hiatt
 Wynonna Judd
 Frances W. Preston
 Michael W. Smith

November 2007 inductees:
 Rodney Crowell
 Bob DiPiero
 Vince Gill
 Jimi Hendrix (inducted posthumously)
 Buddy Killen (inducted posthumously)
 Barbara Mandrell

April 2008 inductees:
 Steven Curtis Chapman
 Merle Kilgore (inducted posthumously)
 Nitty Gritty Dirt Band
 Steve Wariner
 Kirk Whalum
 Hank Williams Sr. (inducted posthumously)

November 2008, inductees:
 Martina McBride
 Randy Travis
 Little Richard
 Jo Walker-Meador
 Trace Adkins
 Elvis Presley (inducted posthumously)
 Michael McDonald

April 2009 inductees:
 Marty Stuart
 Josh Turner
 Cowboy Jack Clement
 Mike Curb
 CeCe Winans
 Dr. R. H. Boyd (inducted posthumously)

November 2009 inductees:
 Kid Rock
 Ernest Tubb (inducted posthumously)
 Tootsie Bess (inducted posthumously)
 Charlie Daniels
 Dolly Parton

November 2010 inductees:
 Eddy Arnold (inducted posthumously)
 Little Jimmy Dickens
 Rascal Flatts
 Bobby Hebb (inducted posthumously)
 Kris Kristofferson
 Mel Tillis

May 2011 inductees:
 Bill Anderson
 Keith Urban

October 2011 inductee:
 Peter Frampton

November 2011 inductees:	
 Manuel 	
 Dan Miller (posthumous)
 Dr. Bobby Jones
 Dottie Rambo
 Les Paul	
 Alan Jackson 	
 Kix Brooks

June 2012 inductees:
 Bob Babbitt 	
 Steve Winwood

September 2012 inductees:
 Kings of Leon

June 2015 inductees:
 Jack White
 Loretta Lynn

September 2015 inductees:
 Garth Brooks
 Karl Dean
 Trisha Yearwood

October 2015 inductees:
 Johnny Cash
 Steve Cropper
 Miranda Lambert
 Bud Wendell

May 2016 inductees:
Alabama
Sam Moore

October 2016 inductees:
 Faith Hill
 Tim McGraw

April 2017 inductees:
Amy Grant
Martha Ingram

September 2017 inductees:
Little Big Town
Lula C. Naff
Tom Ryman

October 2017 inductee:
Kenny Rogers

August 2018 inductees:
Ben Folds
Brenda Lee
Jeannie Seely
Ray Stevens

October 2019 inductees:
Lady Antebellum
Clint Black
Mac McAnally
Chet Atkins (inducted posthumously)
DeFord Bailey (inducted posthumously)

April 2022 inductees:
Dierks Bentley
Keb' Mo'
Bobby Bare
Connie Smith

October 2022 inductees:
John Prine (inducted posthumously)
Patsy Cline (inducted posthumously)
Dr. Paul T. Kwami (inducted posthumously)
Ed Hardy (inducted posthumously)

See also
 StarWalk
 List of music museums

References

External links
Music City Walk of Fame official website

Culture of Nashville, Tennessee
Music halls of fame
Halls of fame in Tennessee
Walks of fame
Awards established in 2006
Tourist attractions in Nashville, Tennessee